Story of Kennedy Town (西環的故事) is a 1990 Hong Kong action drama film directed by Wu Ma and starring Waise Lee, Mark Cheng and Aaron Kwok as three close friends living in poverty whom decide to join the police force. However, one of them becomes consumed by greed and their friendship becomes tested.

Cast and roles
 Waise Lee as Chong Pang
 Mark Cheng as Ko Tim-keung
 Aaron Kwok as Lee Siu-wai
 Sharla Cheung as Lai
 May Lo as Wai-sum
 Bill Tung as Uncle Chiu
 Tai Po as Chuen
 Wu Ma as Detective Sergeant Wong
 Chu Tau as thug
 Billy Ching as Mak Ying
 Chun Kwai-bo as Ying's thug
 Jameson Lam as Ying's thug

See also
 Kennedy Town
 Aaron Kwok filmography
 Jackie Chan filmography

External links
 
 HK Cinemagic entry

1990 films
1990s action drama films
Hong Kong action drama films
Police detective films
1990s Cantonese-language films
Films directed by Wu Ma
Films set in Hong Kong
Films shot in Hong Kong
1990 drama films
1990s Hong Kong films